Albert Mark Ambler (27 September 1892 – 27 November 1970) was an Australian cricketer. A wicket-keeper, he played twenty-two first-class matches for South Australia between 1920 and 1926.

References

External links
 
 

1892 births
1970 deaths
Australian cricketers
South Australia cricketers
People from Murray Bridge, South Australia
Cricketers from South Australia